This list of North Carolina A&T Aggies head football coaches includes those coaches who have led the North Carolina A&T Aggies football team that represents the North Carolina Agricultural and Technical State University in the sport of American football.  The North Carolina A&T Aggies currently compete in the Division I Football Championship Subdivision (FCS) of the National Collegiate Athletic Association (NCAA), and the Mid-Eastern Athletic Conference (MEAC). Nineteen men have served as the Aggies' head coach, including one who has served as interim head coach, since the Aggies began play in the fall of 1924. In February 2011, Rod Broadway was named the new head coach of the Aggies, and the following year, led the team in its first winning season in nine years. Since the inception of the program, six coaches have let the Aggies in postseason bowl games: Charles DeBerry, William Bell, Bert Piggott, Hornsby Howell, Mo Forte, Bill Hayes, George Small, & Rod Broadway. Eight Aggie coaches have led their teams to conference championships during their tenure, with Bill Hayes and Burt Piggott both winning the most at three each. Three Aggie coaches have won the Black college football national championship during their tenures; Hornsby Howell in 1968, and Bill Hayes in 1990 and 1999, and Rod Broadway in 2015.

Key

Coaches

Notes

References

North Carolina A&T
North Carolina sports-related lists